Narzullo Dustov was a politician from Tajikistan who served as Vice President of Tajikistan from 1991 to 1992 and Deputy Chairman of the Supreme Soviet.

Personal life 
Dustov was born in Darvoz District during .

On 6 May 1994, an assassination was attempted when some individuals fired at him with machine gun inside the car. In this attempt, the deputy and bodyguard were wounded.

Dustov died in Uzbekistan on 1 November 2022 from cancer aged 82.
He was buried in Tashkent.

References 

20th-century births
2022 deaths
Year of birth missing
Vice presidents of Tajikistan
20th-century Tajikistani politicians
People from Gorno-Badakhshan Autonomous Region
Deaths in Uzbekistan